Strong House or Strong Hall may refer to a fortified house, or to houses named after owners called "Strong", including the following:

Strong House (Coventry, Connecticut), listed on the National Register of Historic Places (NRHP)
Strong-Davis-Rice-George House, Eatonton, Georgia, listed on the NRHP in Putnam County
Fernand-Strong House, Lawrence, Kansas, listed on the NRHP in Douglas County
Strong Hall (Lawrence, Kansas), NRHP-listed
Strong House (Amherst, Massachusetts), NRHP-listed
William Strong House (Preston, Minnesota), listed on the NRHP in Fillmore County
Rau/Strong House, St. Paul, Minnesota, NRHP-listed
William Strong House (Spring Valley, Minnesota), listed on the NRHP in Fillmore County
Richard Strong Cottage, Dublin, New Hampshire, NRHP-listed
Capt. Richard Strong House, Dublin, New Hampshire, NRHP-listed
George A. Strong House, Plainfield, New Jersey, listed on the NRHP in Union County
Elijah Strong House, Ashland, New York, NRHP-listed
Jedediah Strong House, Colonie, New York, NRHP-listed
Strong House (Vassar College), a college dormitory in Poughkeepsie, New York, also known as Strong Hall
Thomas Strong House, Wainscott, New York, NRHP-listed
John Stoughton Strong House, Strongsville, Ohio, listed on the NRHP in Cuyahoga County
Graves-Fisher-Strong House, Monmouth, Oregon, listed on the NRHP in Polk County
Alice Henderson Strong House, Portland, Oregon, NRHP-listed
Gaston–Strong House, Portland, Oregon, NRHP-listed
John Strong House, Addison, Vermont, listed on the NRHP in Addison County
Jedediah Strong II House, Hartford, Vermont, listed on the NRHP in Windsor County
Samuel Paddock Strong House, Vergennes, Vermont, listed on the NRHP in Addison County
Gen. Samuel Strong House, Vergennes, Vermont, listed on the NRHP in Addison County

See also
William Strong House (disambiguation)
Hattie M. Strong Residence Hall, Washington, D.C., NRHP-listed
Strong's Block, Newton, Massachusetts, NRHP-listed
Strong Building, Beloit, Wisconsin, listed on the NRHP in Rock County